Hubli Tigers is a Karnataka Premier League Twenty20 cricket franchise. The team was the runner-up in the 2016 Karnataka Premier League.

References

External links
 
 https://www.popupster.in/: Official Social Media Partner

Karnataka Premier League
Indian club cricket teams
Sport in Karnataka